Shiju Nambiyath, is a Script Writer and Dialogue writer in Malayalam cinema.

Personal life 
Shiju was born to Sri. K. C Thankappan and Smt. N.K Pankajakshi in Palakulam, Alappuzha district on 6 June 1973.

Film career 
He started his Script writing career with well known Script writer Cheriyan Kalpakavadi. Then he worked as assistant director and associate script writer with many versatile film Directors and writers like Venu Nagavally, Vipin Mohan, Madhupal and T. A. Shahid. In his early professional life, he was working with C-DIT as assistant director in Documentary wing and also wrote and Directed a documentary for PRD Kerala named "Alappuzha Vikasana Vismayam". He was also a member of Theater classification project for Kerala Chalachithra Academy.

His noted co-writing includes blockbusters like Ben Johnson, Rajamanikyam, Keerthi Chakra, Kurukshetra. His independent story, Screenplay and Dialogues were Housefull, Mission 90 Days (Dialogues) and Major Ravi - Mohanlal movie, 1971: Beyond Borders (Dialogues), Sadrishya Vakyam 24 : 29 (2017) (Screenplay and dialogues)

References 

Living people
1973 births
People from Alappuzha district